The 1944–45 SM-sarja season was the 14th season of the SM-sarja, the top level of ice hockey in Finland. Nine teams participated in the league, and Ilves Tampere won the championship.

Regular season

References

Liiga seasons
1944–45 in Finnish ice hockey
Fin